|}

The Prix Allez France is a Group 3 flat horse race in France open to thoroughbred fillies and mares aged four years or older. It is run over a distance of 2,000 metres (about 1¼ miles) at Chantilly in late April or early May.

History
The event is named after Allez France, a successful mare trained at Chantilly during the 1970s. Her victories included the Prix de l'Arc de Triomphe in 1974.

The Prix Allez France was established in 2004, and the first running was won by Pride. It was one of several races for older fillies introduced that year across Europe. The races were designed as incentives to keep more fillies and mares from being exported or prematurely retired to stud.

Records
Most successful horse:
 no horse has won this race more than once

Leading jockey (3 wins):
 Maxime Guyon – Announce (2011), Romantica (2013), Marypop (2016)

Leading trainer (5 wins):

 André Fabre – Macleya (2007), Announce (2011), Romantica (2013), Kitesurf (2018), Morgan Le Faye (2019)

Leading owner (2 wins):
 HH Aga Khan IV – Shemima (2009), Shemiyla (2010)

Winners

See also
 List of French flat horse races

References

 Racing Post:
 france-galop.com – A Brief History: Prix Allez France.
 galop.courses-france.com – Prix Allez France – Palmarès depuis 2004.
 galopp-sieger.de – Prix Allez France.
 ifhaonline.org – International Federation of Horseracing Authorities – Prix Allez France (2019).
 pedigreequery.com – Prix Allez France – Chantilly.

Middle distance horse races for fillies and mares
Chantilly Racecourse
Horse races in France
2004 establishments in France
Recurring sporting events established in 2004